The Tribhuvan Museum is a museum located in Nepal. It is located alongside Birendra Museum and Mahendra Museum. It contains personal artefacts that belonged to King Tribhuvan Bir Bikram Shah, who is internationally known Nepalese king in the modern history.

History
According to the historians, it is the palace from where Late King Tribhuvan Bir Bikram Shah used to watch over all the houses to make sure if every people during his regime used to cook their food.

See also 
 List of museums in Nepal

References 

Museums in Kathmandu
Kathmandu Durbar Square